The chocolate-vented tyrant (Neoxolmis rufiventris) is a species of bird in the family Tyrannidae. The species was first scientifically described by Vieillot in 1823.

It breeds in southern Argentina, Chile and Tierra del Fuego; during the austral winter it migrates north to the Pampas.

Its natural habitat is temperate grassland.

References

chocolate-vented tyrant
Birds of Patagonia
Birds of Tierra del Fuego
chocolate-vented tyrant
Taxa named by Louis Jean Pierre Vieillot
Taxonomy articles created by Polbot